Toshiyoshi is a masculine Japanese given name.

Possible writings
Toshiyoshi can be written using many different combinations of kanji characters. Here are some examples:

敏義, "agile, justice"
敏吉, "agile, good luck"
敏善, "agile, virtuous"
敏芳, "agile, virtuous/fragrant"
敏良, "agile, good"
敏慶, "agile, congratulate"
俊義, "talented, justice"
俊吉, "talented, good luck"
俊善, "talented, virtuous"
俊芳, "talented, virtuous/fragrant"
俊良, "talented, good"
俊嘉, "talented, excellent"
利義, "benefit, justice"
利吉, "benefit, good luck"
利芳, "benefit, virtuous/fragrant"
利良, "benefit, good"
寿義, "long life, justice"
寿吉, "long life, good luck"
寿良, "long life, good"
年義, "year, justice"
年吉, "year, good luck"
年能, "year, capacity"
雋吉, "genius, good luck"

The name can also be written in hiragana としよし or katakana トシヨシ.

Notable people with the name
Toshiyoshi Ito (伊藤 雋吉, 1840–1921), Imperial Japanese Navy admiral.
Toshiyoshi Kawaji (川路 利良, 1829–1879), Japanese politician.
Toshiyoshi Miyazawa (宮澤 俊義, 1899–1976), Japanese jurist.

Japanese masculine given names